Parkgate and Aldwarke railway station was a railway station situated in Parkgate a district of Rotherham, South Yorkshire, England on the Manchester, Sheffield and Lincolnshire Railway company's line between Rotherham Road and Kilnhurst Central.  The station, opened in July 1873, was originally known as "Aldwarke", taking its name from the local manor house nearby which it served along with 8 or 9 servants cottages and a small farmstead. The principal reason for the building of the station, however, was its close proximity to two local collieries, Aldwarke Main and Roundwood. The stopping passenger service fitted in with the requirements of the shift workers at collieries and with many workers living in Rotherham it was recorded that over 100 men would arrive at the station for the early shift alone.

The station was built in the M.S.& L.R. "Double Pavilion" style with the main buildings on the Doncaster-bound platform and a waiting shelter on the other.  The station also had the only wall drinking-fountain on the line, a feature of many M.S.& L.R. rebuilt stations.  The station facilities included a small goods yard with two sidings and a carriage and cattle dock.

The station was closed to passengers on  29 October 1951.

The access to the station, its sidings and both Aldwarke and Roundwood collieries was controlled by a signal box, named Aldwarke Main, situated some 100 yards on the Doncaster side of the station.

References
D.L.Franks, "Parkgate and Aldwarke station signal box" "Forward", the journal of the Great Central Railway Society, No.77 (May 1990), page 1–5. . 
 Station on navigable O.S. map. Station is the closed one next to the still open (on this map) Parkgate and Rawmarsh station.

Disused railway stations in Rotherham
Former Great Central Railway stations
Railway stations in Great Britain opened in 1873
Railway stations in Great Britain closed in 1951